Newhall is a suburban settlement located in Swadlincote, South Derbyshire, England. As of the 2011 census it had a population of 776. The village of Stanton is nearby.

Newhall village
A commuter settlement between Swadlincote and Burton upon Trent the village lies between the A444 to its south and the A511 to its north. To its east is the market town of Ashby-de-la-Zouch, very close to the M42 linking Nottingham (NE) and Birmingham (SW). Burton upon Trent is to the west with the A38 heading south to Lichfield and north for Derby and the M1. Slightly further north is the A50 linking the Stoke-on-Trent and the M6 motorway (east) one way and the M1 and Leicestershire (west) the other. It is geographically well placed for the major road network in all directions.
Swadlincote is the closest population centre, though it is effectively a northern suburb of the town.

There are regular buses linking Burton upon Trent to Ashby-de-la-Zouch (the number 9 Midland Classic or Swadlincote to Burton upon Trent (the 4,8,9,19, Midland Classic) 
The nearest railway station is in Burton upon Trent (Midland Mainline) servicing Birmingham, Nottingham, Newcastle upon Tyne, Cardiff, Hereford and Bristol.

At one time there were over 60 public houses and off-licences in Newhall. One researcher has listed 37 of them.

In 1971, Newhall was the centre of population for Great Britain. It was first calculated as being at Rodsley in 1901 and has spread south to be at Appleby Magna by the year 2000.

There are two secondary schools, William Allitt Academy, and The Pingle Academy nearby in Swadlincote.

Stanton and Newhall Parish
Stanton is very small and is to the south west of Newhall near the A444. It is clearly separate from Newhall. The Repton parish borders the north, a section of Stapenhill parish is to the northwest, Linton parish is east and south with Church Gresley parish covering a small southern area. Swadlincote Parish is southwest and finally Midway parish links the northeast back up to Repton. Unlike Stanton, Newhall merges into Swadlincote and Midway. Roads define the parish boundaries.

The population is around 7,300 (2001) A similar number for Midway and about a thousand less for Swadlincote.

St John's Anglican Church is just off High Street. Stanton Methodist Church is on Park Road at the junction of the A444. St Peter's and St Paul’s Catholic Church is just inside the Swadlincote parish. High Street becomes Union Road and at the junction of Darklands Road it becomes Newhall Road. It is here also, that St Edward's Catholic Primary School and Catholic Club are found.

Local government
The Newhall and Stanton ward is in the non-metropolitan district of South Derbyshire, and in the county of Derbyshire.  In the 2001 census, the Newhall ward, as defined in 1998, had a population of 6,214.  In 2005, the ward was renamed Newhall and Stanton, and enlarged slightly, to include more of the Newhall area; at the time of the 2001 census the area covered by the new ward had a population of 6,963.

Sport
A greyhound racing track was opened on Oversetts Road on 10 May 1930. The racing was independent (not affiliated to the sports governing body the National Greyhound Racing Club) known as a flapping track, which was the nickname given to independent tracks. The track also hosted whippets and the main distances for greyhounds was 300 and 500 yards. The date of closure is not known.

Notable residents
Edwin Bennett, an English American pottery pioneer, was born in Newhall in 1818.
Ben Warren, an England international footballer, was born here in 1879.
Jean (Emmeline) Hanson, Professor of Biology at the University of London, was born in Newhall in 1919.
Jack Atkin, professional footballer, was born here in 1883.

References

External links

Stanton and Newhall at Genuki
Newhall Resources

Villages in Derbyshire
Swadlincote